Bexley High School (BHS) is a public high school located in Bexley, Ohio, a suburb of Columbus.

Athletics

Bexley’s athletic program includes teams in the following sports: football, basketball, baseball, cheerleading, cross country, field hockey, lacrosse, soccer, softball, swimming, tennis, track, volleyball, and wrestling. Bexley purchased artificial grass for athletes to perform on in the winter of 2003. Teams have won the Ohio High School Athletic Association State Championships in:
 Boys Golf - 2015
 Girls Soccer - 2009
 Boys Basketball - 1983
 Boys Soccer - 2003, 2005
 Girls Volleyball - 1977
 Girls Tennis (OTCA)- 1975, 1976, 1977, 1978
 Boys Tennis (OTCA)- 1975, 2017

Football program
In 2016, the program earned its first home playoff game and first playoff win, and went 11–1. The program also earned a playoff spot in the 2008, 2013, 2014, and 2015 seasons, all under Coach John Smith.

After the 2016 season Coach Smith resigned. As his replacement, Nathan Castorena took over the Lions and served for two seasons. In March 2019, Bexley announced the hiring of long-time Central Ohio coach Mike Golden.

Soccer program
The Men's and women's soccer teams have combined for 12 state final fours since 1999. The men's team has won two state championships (in 2003 and 2005) and has appeared in multiple Final Four and Regional Finals. They have also had a flurry of All-District, All-State, and two All-American selections. The men's program won their league championship for 15 straight seasons until the streak was ended in 2009. The women have been one of the most consistent teams of their sport in the state; they were state finalists in 1999 through 2003, 2005, and 2006; state runners-up in 1999; and state champions in 2009. The women have also had multiple all-district, all-state, and all-American recipients.

Ross Friedman was a four-year letter winner and captained the team his junior and senior years. During his tenure at Bexley, he led the team to two state semi-final appearances, earning first team All-MSL as a junior, first team all-district, first team all-state and NSCAA all region as a senior.

Wrestling program

The wrestling program has had individual successes throughout the school's history. There have been numerous state qualifiers, 10 state placers and one state champion. As a team there has not been a great deal of success until recently when they earned a Mid-State League Title in 2017 for first time since 1998. A team dual record of 17-2 was also set in 2017 breaking the previous season record of 16–3. The program currently has successful youth and junior high teams as well.

Softball program
The 2018 season was one of the most successful in program history with the team going 14-9 and winning two games in the state tournament (defeating Licking Valley and London). The Lions advanced to the district semi-finals and fell to Hebron Lakewood.

Rivals
Bexley's rival is the Columbus Academy Vikings. This competition stems from Columbus Academy being just two miles from Bexley High School before Academy's move to Gahanna, Ohio. Other rivals of Bexley include the Grandview Heights Bobcats, the Bishop Hartley Hawks, the Whitehall-Yearling High School Rams and the St. Charles Cardinals.

Clubs

Conservative Club
Art Club
Bexleo (Yearbook)
Ski Club
Environmental Club
Book Club
Key Club
The Lamplight
In The Know
Latin Club - functions as a local chapter of both the Ohio Junior Classical League (OJCL) and the National Junior Classical League (NJCL).
Student Council
Band
Choirs: Men's Glee, Women's Glee, Men's Chorus, Women's Chorale, and Vocal Ensemble
Orchestra: Concert Orchestra, Bexley Sinfonia
Chess Club
Ultimate
Engineering Club
eSports Club
Marvel DC Discussion Club

Band program

There are over 100 students in the band program at the school.

Marching Band

High School Band consists of three separate fields of study starting with the Marching Band during the football season which begins in the summer. For one week, students come together to begin to learn the music as well as the marching for each song. Marching Band is a Co-Curricular Board of Education-supported class, which follows district policies and students receive a grade.

Concert Band

Concert Band begins at the conclusion of the football season. The students are split into two bands for the Concert Band Season - Symphonic Band and Prism. Concerts are graded performances, including OMEA Contests, and opportunities for OMEA Solo and Ensemble. The Concert Band is a Co-Curricular, Board of Education-supported class where students receive a grade and credit for participation.

Pep Band
Pep Band, considered an extension of the Marching Band, is an opportunity to perform for men's and women's home varsity basketball games. It is a volunteer band composed of students from the school band program.

Jazs Band

Jazs Band is a Co-Curricular, Board of Education-supported class where students receive a grade and credit for participation. It performs several concerts throughout the year. To join, auditions are necessary, and most instruments are accepted. The Jazs Band has traveled to conferences (Beaver Creek Jazs Festival and Capital University Jazs and World Music Festival).

Orchestra
The Bexley High School Orchestra is in two classes:  Concert Orchestra, which is the entry-level orchestra and Sinfonia Orchestra, which is the highest level performance group in the program.  During the summer is Orchestra Camp (parallel to Band Camp, which occurs at the same time) which has been in session since 1975.

Concert Orchestra
A high school entry-level group, this ensemble concentrates on building the necessary technical skills for an advanced performance level.

Bexley Sinfonia
The highest level performance group in the orchestra program, this ensemble performs complex and difficult orchestral literature.

Performance
2020: U.S. News & World Report named BHS the top public high school in Central Ohio, third best in Ohio, and 136th nationally.
2019:  The Ohio Department of Education Report Card showed that, among high schools, BHS had the highest Performance Index Score in Franklin County.
2019:  U.S. News & World Report named BHS the top public high school in Central Ohio, fourth best in Ohio, and 132nd nationally.
2018: The Ohio Department of Education Report Card showed that, among high schools, BHS had the highest Performance Index Score in Franklin County, the highest percentage of students scoring Advanced or Advanced Plus in Central Ohio, and the fifth highest Value Added score in the state.
2018: Niche.com named BHS the eighth best public high school in Ohio.
2018: U.S. News & World Report named BHS the top public high school in Central Ohio, fourth in Ohio, and 185th in the nation.
2016-2017:  The Ohio Department of Education released results which showed BHS to have the highest Gifted Performance Index Score, and second highest Performance Index Score, among public high schools in Franklin County.
2017:  The Washington Post named BHS the most challenging high school in Central Ohio, fourth in Ohio, and 250th in the nation.
2017:  The National Center for Education Statistics and research from TheBestSchools.org, a resource for career and education guidance, ranked Bexley High School as the top public high school in Central Ohio, second best in Ohio, and 62nd nationally.
2016:  Newsweek named BHS 120th nationally, seventh in Ohio, and first in Central Ohio.  In its companion study Beating the Odds (based on performance, while accounting for student poverty rates), BHS was 91st nationally and first in Central Ohio.
2016:  Bexley Schools was No. 1 for Franklin County school districts in multiple categories including SAT Mean Score (1783), percentage of students taking AP courses (82.8%), and percentage of students receiving an AP score of 3 or higher (68.3%).

Eastland-Fairfield Career & Technical School

Notable alumni

Karibi Fubara, Actor, class of 1993
Marco Arment, founder of Instapaper and early Tumblr engineer
Natalia Fedner, fashion designer
Judah Folkman, eminent surgeon and medical researcher in Boston
Ross Friedman, former Harvard and Columbus Crew professional soccer player
Bob Greene, author (class of 1965; chronicled second semester of junior year and first semester of senior year in his book Be True To Your School)
Eileen Heckart (Listed as Anna Eileen Heckart), Class of 1937, Broadway, Movie and TV Academy and Tony Award-winning actress
Kevin S. Huffman, former Tennessee Education Commissioner
Daniel H. Pink, author
Josh Radnor, actor, How I Met Your Mother
Captain Willard F. Searle, Jr, U.S. Navy Supervisor of Salvage from 1964 to 1969
K. B. Sharp, Former WNBA player
Gayle Smith, Coordinator of the global COVID response and health security at the U.S. Department of State
R. L. Stine, author
Andy Tongren, musician, Young Rising Sons
Les Wexner, CEO of L Brands and Ohio's richest person.

References

High schools in Franklin County, Ohio
Bexley, Ohio
Public high schools in Ohio